Saint-Germain-des-Prés is a quarter of Paris, France.

Saint-Germain-des-Prés may also refer to:

In Paris
 Saint-Germain-des-Prés (abbey), early medieval church from which the quarter took its name
 Saint-Germain-des-Prés (Paris Métro), metro station in the quarter  
 Festival Jazz à Saint-Germain-des-Prés, jazz festival in the quarter

Communes elsewhere in France
 Saint-Germain-des-Prés, Dordogne
 Saint-Germain-des-Prés, Loiret
 Saint-Germain-des-Prés, Maine-et-Loire
 Saint-Germain-des-Prés, Tarn

See also
 Saint-Germain-des-Prés Café, a series of nu jazz compilation albums
 Saint-Germain (disambiguation)
 Després, surname
 Saint-Germain-près-Herment, commune in Puy-de-Dôme, France